Anderson Alexandro Ferreira dos Santos (born August 30, 1977), better known as Lexe,  is a Brazilian footballer that currently plays for Persibo Bojonegoro in the Indonesia Premier League.

References

1977 births
Association football defenders
Brazilian expatriate footballers
Brazilian expatriate sportspeople in Indonesia
Brazilian footballers
Expatriate footballers in Indonesia
Liga 1 (Indonesia) players
Living people
Persibo Bojonegoro players
PSIS Semarang players
Gresik United players
PSMS Medan players